Catherine de Guise may refer to:

 Catherine de Lorraine (1552–1596), Duchess of Montpensier
 Catherine of Cleves, (1548–1633) was the wife of Henry, Duke of Guise and Duchess of Guise from 1570 to 1588